The 1989–90 Argentine Primera B Nacional was the fourth season of second division professional of football in Argentina. A total of 22 teams competed; the champion and runner-up were promoted to Argentine Primera División.

Club information

Standings
Huracán was declared champion and was automatically promoted to Primera División, and the teams placed 2nd to 10th qualified for the Second Promotion Playoff.

Second Promotion Playoff
The Second Promotion Playoff or Torneo Reducido was played by the teams placed 2nd to 10th in the overall standings: Quilmes (2nd) who entered in the Semifinals, Douglas Haig (3rd) who entered in the Second Round, San Martín (T) (4th), Lanús (5th), Atlético de Rafaela (6th), Belgrano (7th), Banfield (8th), Sportivo Italiano (9th) and Colón (10th); the champion of Primera B Metropolitana: Deportivo Morón and Deportivo Laferrere and Atlanta, both winners of Zonales Noroeste y Sureste from Torneo del Interior. The winner was promoted to Primera División.

1: Qualified because of sport advantage.

Relegation

Note: Clubs with indirect affiliation with AFA are relegated to their respective league of his province according to the Argentine football league system, while clubs directly affiliated face relegation to Primera B Metropolitana. Clubs with direct affiliation are all from Greater Buenos Aires, with the exception of Newell's, Rosario Central, Central Córdoba and Argentino de Rosario, all from Rosario, and Unión and Colón from Santa Fe.

Relegation Playoff Matches
Each tie was played on a home-and-away two-legged basis, but if the first match was won by the team of Primera B Nacional (who also played the first leg at home), there was no need to play the second. If instead, the team from the Regional leagues wins the first leg, the second leg must be played, leg that, if its won by the team of Primera B Nacional, a third leg must be played, if the third leg finishes in a tie, the team from Primera B Nacional remains on it. 
This season, Cipolletti had to play against Fernández Oro from the Liga Deportiva Confluencia (Río Negro Province), Central Córdoba (SdE) had to play against Güemes (SdE) from the Liga Santiagueña de Fútbol, and Atlético Tucumán had to play against Atlético Concepción from the Liga Tucumana de Fútbol.

Cipolletti remains in Primera B Nacional.

Central Córdoba (SdE) remains in Primera B Nacional.

Atlético Tucumán remains in Primera B Nacional.

See also
1989–90 in Argentine football

References

External links

Primera B Nacional seasons
2
1989 in South American football leagues
1990 in South American football leagues